Ureparapara (also known as Parapara for short; once known as Bligh Island) is the third largest island in the Banks group of northern Vanuatu, after Gaua and Vanua Lava.

The climate on the island is humid tropical. The average annual rainfall exceeds 4000 mm. Ureparapara is subject to frequent earthquakes and cyclones.

Geography
Ureparapara island is an old volcanic cone that has been breached by the sea on its east coast. The resulting bay is known as Divers' Bay, and as Löyöp  in the local language of the same name.

History
The first recorded European who arrived to Ureparapara was the Spanish explorer Pedro Fernández de Quirós on 15 June 1606. He first named the island Pilar de Zaragoza; however, later on, it is charted as Nuestra Señora de Montserrate both by him and his chaplain Fray Martin de Munilla.

In 1789, the island was rediscovered by William Bligh, during his journey from Tonga to Timor after the mutiny on the Bounty. After this, Ureparapara was known for a while under the name Bligh Island.

Population and culture

Population
The population was 437 in 2009.
There are three villages on the island. The main village is Lear. The others are Lehali (on the west coast) and Leqyangle.

Languages
Two languages are spoken on the island: Lehali and Löyöp, with respectively 200 and 240 speakers.

In his 1885 survey of the region's language varieties, the missionary and linguist Robert Codrington described the island as being home to two language varieties, which he calls Retan in the West and the Bay in the East.  Comparison of his description with modern data shows that Retan was the same language as modern Lehali; whereas the Bay was apparently the ancestor of Löyöp (also called Divers Bay today).

Codrington treats Retan and the Bay as if they were two dialects of a single language, which he calls Norbarbar; however, the many differences he quotes between them suggest they might as well have been treated as two distinct languages. A more recent survey by linguist A. François confirms that these are two separate languages.

Oral history on Ureparapara, as cited by various sources, reports that the current population of the Bay (Löyöp speakers) includes descendants of refugees who were native to the nearby Reef islands: they were forced to migrate to Ureparapara by an event that is described sometimes as a tsunami in the 1930s, or a cyclone in the 1950s.  It is likely that the modern Löyöp language results from the merger of two language varieties: the original dialect of the Bay as described by Codrington (1885), and the one originally spoken on Rowa – now a deserted archipelago.

A 2014 glottometric study of the Banks islands has shown that Löyöp is close to Mwotlap and Volow, whereas Lehali shares elements both with Löyöp and with Lo-Toga in the Torres Islands.

Name of the island
The name Ureparapara  reflects the way the island is named in the language of Mota, which was once chosen by missionaries, at the end of the 19th century, as the reference language for the area.

The island is locally named Noypēypay  in Lehali, Aö  in Löyöp. Except for the latter term (of unknown origin), the names descend from a Proto-Torres-Banks *Ureᵐbaraᵐbara, which may be understood as “the island of slopes” or “full of slopes”. The name Norbarbar reported by Codrington for the island is of the same origin.

Historical sites
Ureparapara is known to host historical sites made of coral stone, named nowon and votwos in Lehali. These ancestral villages, located inland in the forest, were abandoned in the 19th century, yet have been preserved under the vegetation; they have been proposed for inclusion amongst the World Heritage sites of UNESCO. One of the most famous sites is a 12-feet high stone platform called Votwos. These used to serve as a ceremonial platform for the high-profile grade-taking ceremonies, known as sok or nsok in Lehali, and referred to in the anthropological literature as suqe or sukwe (after their name in Mota).

These sites are now only visited for ceremonial purposes, as most people nowadays live along the coast.

References

Bibliography

 .
.
.
.

Islands of Vanuatu
Volcanoes of Vanuatu
Torba Province